Joe is the sixth French studio album by Joe Dassin. It came out in 1972 on CBS Disques.

Commercial performance 
The album reached at least the top 4 in Wallonia (French Belgium) and at least the top 10 in Finland (according to the charts, courtesy respectively of Telemoustique and Intro, U.S. Billboard published in its "Hits of the World" section).

Track listing

References

External links 
 

1972 albums
Joe Dassin albums
CBS Disques albums